Presentation College, Windsor (PCW) was an independent Roman Catholic, secondary, day school for girls, located in Windsor, an inner suburb of Melbourne, Victoria, Australia. The school was founded in 1873. The brother school of PCW was the Christian Brothers College, St Kilda (CBC), located adjacent to PCW.

History
Presentation Convent, Windsor was established upon the arrival of seven Presentation Sisters from Ireland in 1873. Prior to their arrival, from 1839, the Church and colonial government debated the need for education to be provided by local church schools.

The Victorian government wanted to alter the education legislation. It was said that the system of denominational schools was too great a burden on the economy of a young country and left many areas with no access to education. That was resolved following the election of James Wilberforce Stephen to the Victorian Legislative Assembly in 1870, representing St. Kilda. Appointed Attorney-General in 1872, he had responsibility for the proposed Education Bill, which provided for free, secular and compulsory education. After the passage of the bill, financial grants given to denominational schools were discontinued, making the continuation of Catholic schools staffed by lay people financially impossible.

Father Corbett, Parish Priest at St Mary's, East St Kilda, acted quickly and sent a letter to the Presentation Convent in Ireland. It opened in dramatic fashion: "Dear Reverend Mother. From the ends of the earth I write to you for help ..." Responding to the request in September 1873, Sister Mary Paul Mulquin, together with six sisters from Limerick, boarded the steamer, the SS Great Britain, at Liverpool, arriving at Sandridge (Port Melbourne) 21 December 1873.

Presentation Convent Windsor became a reality on Christmas Day 1873. The school commenced in January 1874 with 33 enrolments. By 1883, the enrolment of pupils at Windsor Convent was 367, with 11 sisters and three lay teachers forming the staff.

Closure
On 29 July 2019, it was announced that Presentation College Windsor would close at the end of 2020, due to declining enrolments.

House system
The four houses were formed in 1940 by the Principal at the time Mother Bertrand Rahilly, who was very interested in sport and wanted to encourage students to become more active. Within their House girls compete in the Music Festival, Athletics and Swimming as well as participating in other sports.

Mother Bertrand introduced the names of the Houses and allocated the colours:
 Nagle (yellow): After Nano Nagle, founder of the Presentation Sisters
 Kostka (red): After Stanislaus Kostka, renowned Jesuit who died young and came to symbolise youth
 Xavier (blue): After St Francis Xavier, Jesuit missionary and patron Saint of Australia
 Loyola (green): After St Ignatius Loyola, founder of the Jesuits

Notable alumni
 Jana Wendt, journalist
 Katherine Bourke, judge 
 Anna Burke, politician
 Sheila Florance, actress
 Clare Oliver, health activist
 Pia Miller, actress
Lydia Schiavello, television personality
 Matilda Boseley, reporter for 7NEWS and Guardian Australia

See also 
 List of schools in Victoria
 Victorian Certificate of Education

References

External links 
 Presentation College Website

Girls' schools in Victoria (Australia)
Catholic secondary schools in Melbourne
Presentation Sisters schools
Educational institutions established in 1873
1873 establishments in Australia
Educational institutions disestablished in 2020
2020 disestablishments in Australia
Buildings and structures in the City of Stonnington